Beto Monteiro (born 18  August 1975 in Recife, Brazil) is a Brazilian racing driver. He is currently competing in the Fórmula Truck.

Racing record

Career summary

 Not eligible for points.

Incomplete Fórmula Truck results
(key)

Complete Fórmula Truck Sulamericano results
(key)

Complete Top Race V6 results
(key)

Complete GT Brasil results
(key)

Complete Formula 3 Sudamericana results
(key)

 Not eligible for points.

NASCAR
(key) (Bold - Pole position awarded by qualifying time. Italics - Pole position earned by points standings or practice time. * – Most laps led.)

K&N Pro Series East

References

External links
 

1969 births
Living people
Brazilian racing drivers
Sportspeople from Recife
NASCAR drivers
Brazilian NASCAR drivers
Formula 3 Sudamericana drivers
Stock Car Brasil drivers